The Shire of Barrabool was a local government area about  southwest of Melbourne, the state capital of Victoria, Australia.

History

Barrabool was incorporated as the second road district in the colony on 28 December 1853, and became a shire on 13 June 1865. On 31 May 1927, it annexed parts of the Shire of Winchelsea. Its shire offices were located on Grossmans Road, near the Surf Coast Highway in Torquay, although almost all of Torquay was within the City of South Barwon.

On 18 May 1993, parts of the shire were annexed to the newly created City of Greater Geelong, under then Premier Jeff Kennett. On 9 March 1994, the Shire of Barrabool was abolished, and along with the remainder of the City of South Barwon and parts of the Shire of Winchelsea, was merged into the newly created Surf Coast Shire.

Wards

The Shire of Barrabool was divided into three ridings on 26 February 1958, each of which elected three councillors:
 Jan Juc Riding
 Coast Riding
 Moriac Riding

Towns and localities
 Aireys Inlet
 Anglesea
 Barrabool
 Bellbrae
 Buckley
 Ceres
 Eastern View
 Fairhaven
 Freshwater Creek
 Gnarwarre
 Jan Juc
 Modewarre
 Moriac
 Mount Moriac
 Paraparap
 Torquay* (shared with the City of South Barwon)
 Wandana Heights
 Waurn Ponds

* Council seat.

Population

* Estimate in 1958 Victorian Year Book.

References

External links
 Victorian Places - Barrabool and Barrabool Shire

Barrabool